MRHS may refer to:

United States high schools
Mountain Ridge High School (Maryland), Frostburg, Maryland
Mountain Ridge High School (Arizona), Glendale, Arizona
Mountain Ridge High School (Utah), Herriman, Utah
Manchester Regional High School,  Haledon, New Jersey
Marriotts Ridge High School,  Marriottsville, Maryland
Minnechaug Regional High School, Wilbraham, Massachusetts
Monmouth-Roseville High School,  Monmouth, Illinois
Mesa Ridge High School, Colorado Springs, Colorado

Other uses
 Member of the Royal Horticultural Society